The Cașva is a right tributary of the Gurghiu river in Transylvania, Romania. It discharges into the Gurghiu in the village of Cașva.

References

Rivers of Romania
Rivers of Mureș County